Maren is a Germanic feminine given name. Originally, it has been a Danish variation of the name Marina.

It has also been used as a surname. Notable people with the name include:

Given name
 Maren Ade (born 1976), German film director, screenwriter and producer
 Maren Elisabeth Bang (1797–1884), Norwegian cookbook writer
 Maren Baumbach (born 1981), German handball player
 Maren Brinker (born 1986), German volleyball player
 Maren Derlien (born 1975), German rower
 Maren Eggert (born 1974), German actress
 Maren Hammerschmidt (born 1989), German biathlete
 Maren Hassinger (born 1947), African-American sculpture artist
 Maren Haugli (born 1985), Norwegian long track speed skater
 Maren Jensen (born 1956), American model and actress
 Maren Juel (1749–1815), Norwegian landowner
 Maren Knebel (born 1985), German sprint canoer 
 Maren Kock, (born 1990), German middle-distance runner 
 Maren Kroymann (born 1949), German actress and singer
 Maren Lundby (born 1994), Norwegian ski jumper 
 Maren Meinert (born 1973), German footballer
 Maren Mjelde (born 1989), Norwegian footballer
 Maren Morris (born 1990), American country singer, songwriter, and record producer
 Maren Niemeyer (born 1964), German journalist, author and documentary filmmaker
 Maren Ord (born 1981), Canadian singer-songwriter of rock and pop music
 Maren-Sofie Røstvig (1920–2014), Norwegian literary historian
 Maren Sars (1811–1898), Norwegian socialite
 Maren Schwerdtner (born 1985), German heptathlete
 Maren Seidler (born 1951), American track and field athlete
 Maren Skjøld (born 1993), Norwegian alpine skier
 Maren Ueland (died 2018), Norwegian female murder victim

Surname
 Jerry Maren (1920–2018), American actor
 Juan Marén (born 1971), Cuban wrestler
 Michael Maren (born 1955), American journalist and screenwriter
 Thomas H. Maren (1918–1999), American professor of medicine at the University of Florida

See also
 Murders of Louisa Vesterager Jespersen and Maren Ueland, a 2018 crime that occurred in Morocco
 Marren

Germanic feminine given names